The Women's Shot Put F32-34/51-53 had its Final held on September 10 at 17:00.

Medalists

Results

References
Final

Athletics at the 2008 Summer Paralympics
2008 in women's athletics